Ommal Rmelan Sports Club, previously known as Hay'at Ommal Rmelan, is a Syrian football club based in Rmelan. It was founded in 1959, and reconstructed later on in 1979. They play their home games at the Rmelan Stadium. Their best achievements were winning the Syrian Cup twice in 1962 and 1969 as "Hay'at Ommal Rmelan".

References

Ommal Rmelan
Association football clubs established in 1979
1979 establishments in Syria